Bilozerka is an urban-type settlement in Kherson Raion, Kherson Oblast, southern Ukraine. It hosts the administration of Bilozerka settlement hromada, one of the hromadas of Ukraine. It has a population of

Administrative status 

Until 18 July, 2020, Bilozerka was the administrative center of Bilozerka Raion. The raion was abolished in July 2020 as part of the administrative reform of Ukraine, which reduced the number of raions of Kherson Oblast to five. The area of Bilozerka Raion was merged into Kherson Raion.

History 

In the first weeks of the Southern Ukraine offensive (February/March) of the 2022 Russian invasion of Ukraine, Bilozerka was occupied by the Russian army. On 14 March, 2022, a peaceful rally against the Russian occupiers was held in the village; according to a report by Ukrainska Pravda, Russian soldiers fired into the air and tried to stop the protesters. After the Russian military left the town on 11 November, local residents removed Russian flags and replaced them with Ukrainian ones.

References 

Urban-type settlements in Kherson Raion